Autism Is a World is an American short subject documentary film allegedly written in 2004 by Sue Rubin, an autistic woman who is purported to have learned to communicate via the discredited technique of facilitated communication.  It was nominated in the 77th annual Academy Awards for Best Documentary Short Subject. The film is controversial for promoting the debunked facilitated communication technique.

Synopsis 
Rubin is an autistic woman who was diagnosed as intellectually disabled in early childhood. The film alleges that at the age of thirteen, she learned to express herself through typing of a computer keyboard, revealing that she was in fact highly intelligent. Rubin's dialogue is narrated by actress Julianna Margulies.

Production 
The film was produced and directed by Gerardine Wurzburg and co-produced by the CNN cable network. It aired as part of the series CNN Presents. Douglas Biklen, the director of the Facilitated Communication Institute, was a co-producer.

Criticism 
Autism researchers such as Gina Green of San Diego State University have criticized the film for its positive portrayal of facilitated communication. Green stated that making a film without "even a hint, much less a disclosure" of the evidence against facilitated communication "is appalling". Autism Is a World is described as a propaganda film for the pseudoscience facilitated communication in a report of the magazine Slate.  The Behavior Analysis Association of Michigan (BAAM) pointed out that although Sue Rubin has 2q37 deletion syndrome, which causes handicaps like skeleton malformations and severe developmental disabilities, this issue is not mentioned in the film.  In addition, there is skepticism that Rubin, has an alleged IQ of 133, but cannot perform simple tasks independently, needs a 24 hour care and only has the articulation skills of a two to three-years-old child.  The Nancy Lurie Marks Foundation, which is a supporter of the Facilitated Communication Institute, gave away 16,000 free copies of the film to public libraries in the United States to promote facilitated communication. CNN supported the campaign for the pseudoscience of supported communication through ad-free broadcasting of the documentary in schools.

Literature 
 Behinderungsmodelle in: Franziska Felder: Inklusion und Gerechtigkeit: Das Recht behinderter Menschen auf Teilhabe, Campus Verlag, 2012, p. 61 & 62

Publishing 
 The film was released on DVD in June 2005.

See also
 Autism spectrum disorders in the media
 List of films about autism
 Rapid Prompting Method

References

External links
 
 Autism Is a World at CNN Presents

2004 television films
2004 films
2000s English-language films
2004 short documentary films
Documentary films about autism
CNN original programming
Facilitated communication
American short documentary films
2000s American films